Amin Rais Ohorella (born 25 April 1998) simply known as Aimar is an Indonesian professional footballer who plays as a winger for Liga 2 club Kalteng Putra.

Club career

Borneo
He was signed for Borneo to play in the 2016 Indonesia Soccer Championship A season. He made his league debut for Borneo on 7 October 2016 in a 2–1 lost against Bhayangkara in the 2016 Indonesia Soccer Championship A. Played as Ricky Ohorella substitute, Aimar, his nick name, looks trying to give his best in his first debut. About his first debut, Aimar Ohorella is glad he got a trust from the Coach.

Martapura
He was signed for South Kalimantan club Martapura to play in Liga 2. At the club, he was recruited after receiving an offer from the assistant coach, Isnan Ali. Until the 2019 league competition entered the second round, he was always the coach's choice to become the main player.

Semen Padang
He was signed for Semen Padang to play in Liga 2 in the 2020 season. This season was suspended on 27 March 2020 due to the COVID-19 pandemic. The season was abandoned and was declared void on 20 January 2021.

References

External links
 Amin Rais Ohorella at Soccerway

1998 births
Living people
People from Tulehu
Indonesian footballers
Association football wingers
Borneo F.C. players
Semen Padang F.C. players
Dewa United F.C. players